SDPD may refer to:
 San Diego Police Department
 Self-defeating personality disorder